Big Brother Thailand 2 is the second season of the Thailand reality television series Big Brother Thailand and aired on iTV's primetime block. The season started on 4 February 2006, and ended on 21 May 2006, lasting 107 days. The season was won by Tik Arisa Sonthirod, about 65.96% of total votes cast during the open voting.

Saranyu Vonkarjun reprised his role as the primetime host, while ex-Inside Big Brother host Nana Ribeena helmed a brand new show.

Housemates

Pui (ปุ๋ย)
 Nalintha KittiwanShe is 27 years old from Lamphun. She is the ninth housemate of the season to be evicted, on Day 86 with 48.24% to save.

Joe (โจ) 
 Vitos Tunsurat is 25 years old from Bangkok. He is the second housemate of the season to be evicted, on Day 5 with a 4 of 13 Votes and sixth housemate to be evicted on Day 65 with 47.25% to save.

Oil (ออย) 
 Sirinthon Parnsamut is 21 years old from Bangkok. She is the first housemate of the season to be evicted, on Day 2 with a 4 of 14 Votes.

Birthday (เบริ์ดเดย์) 
 Surasak Dangrae is 19 years old from Prachuap Khiri Khan. He is the third housemate of the season to be evicted, on Day 30 with 12.81% to save.

Kate (เกด) 
 Ngamnate Hirunchanachoke is 20 years old from Bangkok. On Day 10, Kate walked.

Jeff (เจฟ) 
 Rcom Vichatpittayapong is 20 years old from Phichit. On Day 77, Jeff is removed from the house after presenting with chickenpox.

Nok (นก) 
 Kanokrus Taewokut is a 29 years old from Lamphun. She is the eleventh housemate of the season to be evicted, on Day 100 with 44.25% to save.

Bombay (บอมเบย์) 
 Sawatkon Nantapun is 27 years old from Ubon Ratchatani. Bombay is the runner-up, losing to Tik in 23.09% to win.

Tik (ติ๊ก) 
 Arisa Sonthirod is 22 years old from Ang Thong. Tik is the winner of Big Brother Thailand 2 with 65.96% to win.

Oad (โอ๊ค) 
 Surasak Showtitinnawat is 23 years old from Sa Kaeo. On Day 16, Oad is kicked out for writing to Nok secret messages with a pen.

Nui (นุ้ย) 
 Phonpatsorn Suwanmongkong is 22 years old from Lamphun. She is the fourth housemate of the season to be evicted, on Day 44 with 37.88% to save.

Boo (บู) 
 Kirt Tirat is 25 years old from Bangkok. He is the eighth housemate of the season to be evicted, on Day 79 with 23.36% to save and the tenth housemate to be evicted on Day 93 with 46.99% to save.

Whan (หวาน) 
 Narisara Ngampasearchsopon is 24 years old from Nakhon Ratchasima. She is the seventh housemate of the season to be evicted, on Day 72 with 17.55% to save.

Oh (โอ้) 
 Itsara Navee is 27 years old from Bangkok. Oh is the third place housemate, losing to Tik & Bombay in 10.95% to win.

Aum (อุ้ม) 
 Pannee Leedahod is 20 years old from Sing Buri. She is the fifth housemate of the season to be evicted, on Day 58 with 9.58% to save.

Nominations table

 Automatically nominated by Big Brother

Notes
: On Day 2, housemates were asked to vote for one other housemate that they would like to see evicted. Oil received the most votes to evict with 4 and was immediately evicted.
: On Day 5, housemates, again, were asked to vote for one other housemate that they would like to see evicted. Joe received the most votes to evict with 4 and was immediately evicted.
: Week 2's nominations were voided and eviction was cancelled when Kate walked on Day 10.
: Boo couldn't nominate, as he was a guest in the Norwegian/Swedish version of Big Brother. Pui was automatically nominated by Big Brother for rule-breaking.
: Birthday, Joe and Nui (who had all been previously evicted), re-entered the house and stayed in a secret room. Pui had to take care of them without the other housemates finding out that they were there. She passed her secret mission and had to choose one of the 3 to re-enter the main house and become a housemate again. Housemates chose Joe. Joe re-entered the main house on Day 51, Birthday and Nui left the secret room.
: Boo was automatically nominated this Week for discussing/influencing nominations. Jeff was removed from the house on Day 77 after contracting chickenpox. As Jeff was removed, he was to be replaced by a former housemate, as voted for by the Public. All evicted housemates apart from Joe & Whan are eligible to return. Boo was chosen by the Public to re-enter the house just one day after he was Evicted with 62.31% of the vote to Nui's 13.07%, Birthday's 12.42%, Oil's 10.39% and Aum's 1.81%.
: The final three housemates all automatically faced the Public Vote to win.

External links
Big Brother Thailand official website
Webboard Big Brother Thailand official website
Webboard Big Brother Thailand official website
Buddy Board Band official website
Big Brother Thailand Fanclub official website

2006 Thai television seasons
Thailand

th:บิ๊ก บราเธอร์